William Waddell (12 December 1919 – 1979) was a Scottish professional footballer who played primarily as a centre half for Aberdeen and Kettering Town. Waddell played for Aberdeen in their 1947 Scottish Cup Final victory against Hibernian.

References

1919 births
Aberdeen F.C. players
Association football defenders
Scottish Junior Football Association players
Renfrew F.C. players
British Army personnel of World War II
Huddersfield Town A.F.C. wartime guest players
Celtic F.C. wartime guest players
York City F.C. wartime guest players
Kettering Town F.C. players
People from Renfrew
Footballers from Renfrewshire
Scottish Football League players
Scottish footballers
1979 deaths